From the 27th State is an EP by the Pompano Beach, Florida rock bands Further Seems Forever and Recess Theory released on July 4, 1999 by Takehold Records. It was the debut release from both bands. Recess Theory later changed their name to the Legends of Rodeo.

Track listing
Further Seems Forever - "The Bradley" - 3:01
Further Seems Forever - "Justice Prevails" - 4:38
Further Seems Forever - "New Year's Project" - 4:01
Recess Theory - "Checklist Before Chicago" - 2:46
Recess Theory - "Tonight, This Three Hour Drive" - 4:01
Recess Theory - "Oh Dateless Morn'" - 4:36

Performers
Further Seems Forever
Chris Carrabba - vocals
Josh Colbert - guitar
Nick Dominguez - guitar
Chad Neptune - bass
Steve Kleisath - drums
Recess Theory
John Ralston
Nathan Jezek
Jeff Snow
Steven Eshelman

Album information
Record label: Takehold Records
All drum tracks recorded at Cathouse Studios by Mark Loren. All other tracks recorded at Wisner Productions by James Wisner.

References
 

Further Seems Forever albums
Split EPs
1999 EPs
Albums produced by James Paul Wisner